Frédéric Rouvillois (born 1964) is a French academic and author. He is a Professor of Public Law at Paris Descartes University and the author of more than 30 books.

Works

References

1964 births
Living people
Academic staff of Paris Descartes University
French male non-fiction writers
Intellectual historians